Michael 'Bo' Barry (born 10 November 1995) is a footballer who plays for the Northern Mariana Islands national team. He was born in Cambodia.

Career statistics

International

References

External links
 Michael Barry at the Saint Leo University website

1995 births
Living people
Association football midfielders
Northern Mariana Islands footballers
Northern Mariana Islands international footballers